Rat Niyom is one of the seven subdistricts (tambon) of Sai Noi District, in Nonthaburi Province, Thailand. The subdistrict is bounded by (clockwise from north) Sam Mueang, Bo Ngoen, Namai, Lahan, Khlong Khwang, Khun Si and Sai Yai subdistricts. In 2020 it had a total population of 6,759 people.

Administration

Central administration
The subdistrict is subdivided into 8 administrative villages (muban).

Local administration
The whole area of the subdistrict is covered by Rat Niyom Subdistrict Administrative Organization.

References

External links
Website of Rat Niyom Subdistrict Administrative Organization

Tambon of Nonthaburi province
Populated places in Nonthaburi province